Crites Corner is an unincorporated community in Carter County, in the U.S. state of Missouri. The community is located on U.S. Route 60, west of Ellsinore.

Crites Corner was named after Donald Crites, a local merchant.

References

Unincorporated communities in Carter County, Missouri
Unincorporated communities in Missouri